Barypeithes pellucidus is a species of weevil native to Europe. It has been found in North American hardwood forests for over a century. Larva eat roots and overwinter underground.

References

Curculionidae
Beetles described in 1834
Beetles of Europe